Literberry is an unincorporated community and Census designated place in Morgan County, Illinois, United States. Literberry formerly had a post office with ZIP code 62660.

An F4 tornado devastated Literberry on May 18, 1883, killing 12 people.

Demographics

References

Unincorporated communities in Morgan County, Illinois
Unincorporated communities in Illinois